Branchiostegus semifasciatus is a species of marine ray-finned fish, a tilefish belonging to the family Malacanthidae. It is from the Eastern Atlantic, from Casablanca, Morocco to Baia dos Tigres, Angola. They are spotted rarely north of Dakar, Senegal.

References

Malacanthidae
Taxa named by John Roxborough Norman
Fish described in 1931